Clovelly Lifeboat Station, serving the North Devon village of Clovelly and surrounding coastal waters, is run by the Royal National Lifeboat Institution (RNLI). It was established in 1870. The station is flanked by Appledore to the northeast and Bude to the southwest.

History
The first station was opened in 1870 after a particularly bad storm had resulted in a number of fishing boats being lost and fishermen drowned. The boathouse cost £175 to build. The Coxswain in 1908 was Thomas Pengilly, who became the then longest-serving coxswain in the service. A news article of 1935 noted that he had served Clovelly lifeboat for over 48 years, 14 as Second Coxswain and 24 as Coxswain.
In the 32 years from 1899 the lifeboat saved 158 lives. Pengilly retired in 1929 after 54 years of service to the RNLI; he was succeeded as coxswain by Alfred Braund. Coxswain Braund was succeeded in 1932 by J. J. Headon, who retired in 1936 at the age of 60 after 40 years’ service. Coxswain in 1948 was G. Lamey. By 1950 the lifeboat was reported to have saved 328 lives in its 80 years since established.

The RNLI closed the station in 1988 and reopened it in 1998. In the interim, the villagers operated their own rescue service.
In 2011, Thomas Pengilly's great-great-granddaughter Lauren McGuire, 27, became Britain's youngest station manager when she was appointed to Clovelly Lifeboat Station after 10 years' service with the RNLI. She is the fifth generation of her family to serve with Clovelly lifeboat. In the same year a tragedy occurred when Helmsman Jonny Staines went missing; his body was found at Hartland Quay.

Former lifeboats
In 1916 the station was operating the Elinor Roget. A newspaper report described how women helped to launch the lifeboat in the event of fishermen being unavailable. In 1936 the 35-foot motor lifeboat City of Nottingham (built in 1929) was transferred to Clovelly from Hythe. In 1950 the station launched a new motor lifeboat William Cantrell Ashley, a 35-foot, twin 18 horsepower self-righting vessel, equipped with a radio and under the command of Coxswain George Lamey. It was the fifth lifeboat in 80 years to be stationed at Clovelly.

Current lifeboat
 B-Class inshore lifeboat Toby Rundle (B-872), funded by the Rundle Family, Williton, Somerset

Notable services
During a gale on 16 August 1903 the lifeboat launched to two vessels in distress, the schooner Mary Stewart and the yacht Gadfly and rescued both their crews, eight people in all. On 12 February 1906 in Bideford Bay the Clovelly lifeboat stood by the steamer Peruvian (5,000 tons and 30 crew), who had lost her rudder in stormy seas, for five hours during the night until steam tugs could reach the steamer. On 7 February 1913 the lifeboat rescued the six crew of the schooner Ianthe in a strong gale.
In 1962 the lifeboat rescued the seven-man crew from the 3,000 tonne tanker Green Ranger when she was wrecked off Hartland after a towing cable parted.

Awards
Three RNLI Silver Medals and four Bronze Medals have been awarded to Clovelly lifeboat crews, and a silver medal to a Coastguard officer the year before the lifeboat service's inauguration. Coxswain Richard Headon was awarded the Silver Medal of the RNLI in 1882 for his service with the Clovelly Lifeboat Station.

References

Further reading
Seden, Enid M. A Short History of Clovelly Life-Boat Station, 1870–1970, Devon, Jamaica Press (1970)

External links
Clovelly Lifeboat Station on RNLI website
Clovelly village site – lifeboat station

Lifeboat stations in Devon